Rambaldo is a surname. Notable people with the surname include:

Caroline Rambaldo (born 1971), Dutch cricketer
Helmien Rambaldo (born 1980), Dutch cricketer
Laudadio Rambaldo, 14th-century Italian painter

See also
9683 Rambaldo, a minor planet